|}
{| class="collapsible collapsed" cellpadding="0" cellspacing="0" style="clear:right; float:right; text-align:center; font-weight:bold;" width="280px"
! colspan="3" style="border:1px solid black; background-color: #77DD77;" | Also Ran

The 2005 Epsom Derby was a horse race which took place at Epsom Downs on Saturday 4 June 2005. It was the 226th running of the Derby, and it was won by the pre-race favourite Motivator. The winner was ridden by Johnny Murtagh and trained by Michael Bell.

Race details
 Sponsor: Vodafone
 Winner's prize money: £725,000
 Going: Good
 Number of runners: 13
 Winner's time: 2m 35.69s

Full result

* The distances between the horses are shown in lengths or shorter. hd = head.† Trainers are based in Great Britain unless indicated.

Winner's details
Further details of the winner, Motivator:

 Foaled: 22 February 2002 in Great Britain
 Sire: Montjeu; Dam: Out West (Gone West)
 Owner: The Royal Ascot Racing Club
 Breeder: Deerfield Farm
 Rating in 2005 World Thoroughbred Racehorse Rankings: 125

Form analysis

Two-year-old races
Notable runs by the future Derby participants as two-year-olds in 2004.

 Motivator – 1st Racing Post Trophy
 Walk in the Park – 3rd Critérium International
 Dubawi – 1st Superlative Stakes, 1st National Stakes
 Oratorio – 7th Coventry Stakes, 1st Anglesey Stakes, 2nd Phoenix Stakes, 1st Futurity Stakes, 1st Prix Jean-Luc Lagardère, 2nd Dewhurst Stakes
 Kings Quay – 12th Coventry Stakes, 1st Washington Singer Stakes, 6th Somerville Tattersall Stakes

The road to Epsom
Early-season appearances in 2005 and trial races prior to running in the Derby.

 Motivator – 1st Dante Stakes
 Walk in the Park – 2nd Lingfield Derby Trial
 Dubawi – 5th 2,000 Guineas, 1st Irish 2,000 Guineas
 Fracas – 1st Sandown Classic Trial, 1st Derrinstown Stud Derby Trial
 Gypsy King – 1st Dee Stakes
 Hattan – 3rd Sandown Classic Trial, 1st Chester Vase
 Unfurled – 1st Predominate Stakes
 The Geezer – 2nd Dante Stakes
 Grand Central – 2nd Leopardstown 2,000 Guineas Trial Stakes, 3rd Derrinstown Stud Derby Trial
 Oratorio – 4th 2,000 Guineas, 2nd Irish 2,000 Guineas
 Kings Quay – 5th Easter Stakes, 2nd Feilden Stakes, 6th Sandown Classic Trial, 6th Lingfield Derby Trial
 Almighty – 4th Ballysax Stakes, 2nd Chester Vase
 Kong – 1st Lingfield Derby Trial

Subsequent Group 1 wins
Group 1 / Grade I victories after running in the Derby.

 Dubawi – Prix Jacques Le Marois (2005)
 Oratorio – Eclipse Stakes (2005), Irish Champion Stakes (2005)

Subsequent breeding careers
Leading progeny of participants in the 2005 Epsom Derby.

Sires of Classic winners
Dubawi (3rd)
 Waldpark - 1st Deutsches Derby (2008)
 Makfi - 1st 2000 Guineas Stakes (2010)
 Night of Thunder - 1st 2000 Guineas Stakes (2014)
 New Bay - 1st Prix du Jockey Club (2015)
 Dodging Bullets - Tingle Creek Chase (2014), 1st Clarence House Chase (2015), 1st Queen Mother Champion Chase (2015)
Motivator (1st)
 Treve - 1st Prix de Diane (2013), 1st Prix de l'Arc de Triomphe (2013, 2014) 
 Ridasiyna - 1st Prix de l'Opéra (2012)
 Sky Hunter - 3rd Prix du Jockey Club (2013)
 Pentland Hills - 1st Triumph Hurdle (2019)

Sires of Group/Grade One winners
Oratorio (10th) - Later exported to South Africa
 Beethoven - 1st Dewhurst Stakes (2009)
 Military Attack - Hong Kong Horse of the Year (2012-13)
 Mourinho - 1st Underwood Stakes (2015)
 Tidara Angel - 1st Prix Alain du Breil (2011)

Sires of National Hunt horses
Walk In The Park (2nd)
 Douvan - 1st Paddy Power Cashcard Chase (2016)
 Min - 1st Melling Chase (2019)
 Walk In The Mill - 1st Becher Chase (2018, 2019)
 Park Light - 1st Prix Hubert d'Aillieres (2016)

Other Stallions
Fracas (4th) - Fairly useful flat and jumps winners including Smash Williams (1st Round Tower Stakes 2015)

References
 
 sportinglife.com

Epsom Derby
 2005
Epsom Derby
Epsom Derby
2000s in Surrey